Milena Grigorova Trendafilova (Милена Григорова Трендафилова, born  in Varna) is a Bulgarian weightlifter, competing in the 69 kg category and representing Bulgaria at international competitions.

She participated at the 2000 Summer Olympics in the 69 kg event and also at the 2004 Summer Olympics in the 69 kg event. 
She competed at world championships, most recently at the 2003 World Weightlifting Championships.

Major results

References

External links
 
http://www.the-sports.org/milena-trendafilova-weightlifting-spf7576.html
http://www.todor66.com/weightlifting/World/1999/index.html
http://eventsbg.com/en/holidays/2143/Milena-Trendafilova---weightlifting-athlete
https://www.youtube.com/watch?v=URNCcLjaVW0

1970 births
Living people
Bulgarian female weightlifters
Weightlifters at the 2004 Summer Olympics
Olympic weightlifters of Bulgaria
Sportspeople from Varna, Bulgaria
Weightlifters at the 2000 Summer Olympics
World Weightlifting Championships medalists
20th-century Bulgarian women
21st-century Bulgarian women